Hulubești is a commune in Dâmbovița County, Muntenia, Romania. It is composed of five villages: Butoiu de Jos, Butoiu de Sus, Hulubești, Măgura and Valea Dadei.

References

Communes in Dâmbovița County
Localities in Muntenia